Major-General William Green,  (1 August 1882 – 4 December 1947) was a senior officer in the British Army.

Early life
William Green was born on 1 August 1882, son of Colonel Sir William Green,  (1836–1897). In 1914, he married Lesley Kathleen, daughter of Guy Hannaford; they had one daughter.

Military career

Following schooling at Fettes College, Edinburgh, Scotland, and the Royal Military College, Sandhurst, Green was commissioned as a second lieutenant in the Black Watch on 11 August 1900. Promoted to lieutenant on 12 November 1901, he served with the 1st battalion in the Second Boer War between 1901 and 1902, earning the Queen's Medal with clasps 15, 16, 25, 26. He stayed in South Africa until the war ended in June 1902, and returned home on the SS Kinfauns Castle in October that year. In November 1907, he was promoted to captain and between May 1908 and February 1912, he was an adjutant in the Territorial Force.

Green served in World War I, and was posted in France and Belgium three times (August to October 1914, December 1914 to May 1915, and April 1916 to November 1918). Promoted to major on 1 September 1915, he was posted as the brigade major of the Home Forces between November 1915 and April 1916. He was then transferred to the 9th Battalion of the Royal Scots as a temporary major, before promotion to be temporary lieutenant-colonel two months later. He was a brigade commander in France from 15 April 1918. Green had been wounded twice during the War, and was mentioned in despatches five times. He received the Distinguished Service Order with two bars, the Belgian War Cross and the French Legion of Honour (4th Class).

On New Years Day 1919, Green was promoted to brevet lieutenant colonel. After completing a two-year course at the Staff College, Camberley in 1920, he was appointed a general staff officer in the Defence Force (April to July 1921) and then the London District (July 1921 to December 1922). On 1 January 1923, he was appointed an instructor at the Senior Officers School in Woking, where he stayed until September 1925. From 1928 to 1931 he commanded the 2nd Battalion of the Loyal Regiment (North Lancashire). On 2 February 1928, he was promoted to substantive lieutenant-colonel, and on 1 July 1931, he was promoted to colonel (with seniority from 1 January 1923) and appointed a general staff officer with the Southern Command. Having served there for two years, he was appointed a brigade commander of the 9th Infantry Brigade on 21 July 1933. He was promoted to major-general on 1 March 1935 and went on half-pay in June of that year, but returned to full pay in March 1938, when he was appointed a commander of the South-Western Area. He was appointed a Companion of the Order of the Bath in 1937 and retired from the army in 1940, shortly after the outbreak of the Second World War, and died on 4 December 1947, at the age of 65, in Farnborough, Hampshire.

Freemasonry
Green was a Scottish Freemason having been Initiated in The Lodge of Holyrood House (St Luke's), No.44, (Edinburgh, Scotland) o 16 March 1908.

Likenesses
 William Green by Bassano Ltd, 28 February 1928. Whole-plate glass negative. National Portrait Gallery, London (Photographs Collection, NPG x124259; given by Bassano & Vandyk Studios, 1974).
 William Green by Walter Stoneman, 1935. Bromide print, 7 1/2 in. x 4 5/8 in. (189 mm × 116 mm). Commissioned, 1935. National Portrait Gallery, London (Photographs Collection NPG x167947).

References

Bibliography

External links
Generals of World War II

1882 births
Scottish Freemasons
1947 deaths
Graduates of the Royal Military College, Sandhurst
British Army generals of World War II
British Army personnel of World War I
Graduates of the Staff College, Camberley
Black Watch officers
British Army personnel of the Second Boer War
People educated at Fettes College
British Army major generals
Companions of the Order of the Bath
Companions of the Distinguished Service Order